The Other Eye is a Canadian public affairs and variety television series which aired on CBC Television in 1967.

Premise
This series was an attempt at a late-night talk and music variety series. Its debut episode was broadcast the day after Domnion Day and featured Newfoundland premier Joey Smallwood plus a segment in which Canadian citizens were challenged by questions posed to prospective immigrants at Canadian citizenship court. Series regular included Henry Cuesta and his trio. The series was created as an entertaining counterpart to The Public Eye.

The series did not continue into the regular season, nor did proposals to establish a similar local late night show for CBLT Toronto, The Local Eye.

Scheduling
This series was broadcast on Sundays at 10:00 p.m. from 2 July to 27 August 1967. Episodes were 30 minutes except for the hour-long debut broadcast.

References

External links
 
 

CBC Television original programming
1967 Canadian television series debuts
1967 Canadian television series endings
1960s Canadian variety television series
1960s Canadian television news shows
1960s Canadian television talk shows